Alberghetti is a surname. Notable people with the surname include:

Anna Maria Alberghetti (born 1936), Italian singer and actress
Carla Alberghetti (born 1939), Italian actress and singer
Giovanni Alberghetti, Italian sculptor
Francesca Alberghetti, a character on the TV series Chicago Hope, played by Barbara Hershey

Italian-language surnames